CHCA may refer to:

 CHCA-TV, a defunct television station (channel 6) licensed to Red Deer, Alberta, Canada
Child Health Corporation of America, a business alliance of child-care hospitals, headquartered in Shawnee Mission, Kansas
The Collier Heights Community Association (CHCA), a community association in Atlanta, Georgia, USA
The Colorado Hill Climb Association, the group which organizes and supports motorized hill-climbing races in Colorado, USA  
Community Health Charities of America, a non-profit organization headquartered in Arlington, Virginia, USA
Cincinnati Hills Christian Academy, a private university preparatory school in Cincinnati, Ohio, USA
α-Cyano-4-hydroxycinnamic acid, a phenylpropanoid used as a matrix for peptides and nucleotides in matrix-assisted laser desorption/ionization mass spectrometry analyses